This is a list of Kamen Rider Decade episodes. Following the first episode, every two episodes have taken place in an alternate dimension. The first nineteen episodes feature storylines based on the Heisei Kamen Rider Series. The latter half of the series features two story arcs that are original stories, a story arc serving as a crossover with Samurai Sentai Shinkenger, and two story arcs based on the Shōwa Kamen Rider Series. In addition to the 31 episodes, the story of Decade is also told in the films Kamen Rider Decade: All Riders vs. Dai-Shocker and Kamen Rider × Kamen Rider W & Decade: Movie War 2010.

On October 4, 2009, TV Asahi began a re-broadcast of the series from beginning to end at 6:30 am timeslot. When episodes 30 and 31 were rebroadcast on May 2 and 9, 2010, respectively, they were recut with some scenes extended and others cut, labeled as  versions.

Episodes


{| class="wikitable" width="98%"
|- style="border-bottom:8px solid #FF5798"
! width="4%" | # !! Title !! Writer !! Original airdate
|-|colspan="4" bgcolor="#e6e9ff"|

 Rider War 

|-|colspan="4" bgcolor="#e6e9ff"|

 The World of Kuuga 

|-|colspan="4" bgcolor="#e6e9ff"|

 Transcendence 

|-|colspan="4" bgcolor="#e6e9ff"|

 Second Movement ♬ Kiva the Prince 

|-|colspan="4" bgcolor="#e6e9ff"|

 Qualifications of the Biting King 

|-|colspan="4" bgcolor="#e6e9ff"|

 Battle Trial - Ryuki World 

|-|colspan="4" bgcolor="#e6e9ff"|

 The True Culprit's Super Trick 

|-|colspan="4" bgcolor="#e6e9ff"|

 Welcome to Blade Cafeteria 

|-|colspan="4" bgcolor="#e6e9ff"|

 Blade Blade 

|-|colspan="4" bgcolor="#e6e9ff"|

 Phantom Thief of Faiz Academy 

|-|colspan="4" bgcolor="#e6e9ff"|

 555 Faces, 1 Treasure 

|-|colspan="4" bgcolor="#e6e9ff"|

 Reunion Project Agito 

|-|colspan="4" bgcolor="#e6e9ff"|

 Awaken. The Soul Tornado 

|-|colspan="4" bgcolor="#e6e9ff"|

 Cho Den-O Beginning 

|-|colspan="4" bgcolor="#e6e9ff"|

 Here Comes Super Momotaros! 

|-|colspan="4" bgcolor="#e6e9ff"|

 Warning Kabuto is Out of Control 

|-|colspan="4" bgcolor="#e6e9ff"|

 The Path of Grandmother's Flavor 

|-|colspan="4" bgcolor="#e6e9ff"|

 Missing Hibiki 

|-|colspan="4" bgcolor="#e6e9ff"|

 Journey's End 

|-|colspan="4" bgcolor="#e6e9ff"|

 The Dark Riders of Nega World 

|-|colspan="4" bgcolor="#e6e9ff"|

 Going Through the Complete Rider Album 

|-|colspan="4" bgcolor="#e6e9ff"|

 Diend is Wanted 

|-|colspan="4" bgcolor="#e6e9ff"|

 End of Diend 

|-|colspan="4" bgcolor="#e6e9ff"|

 The Samurai Sentai Appear 

|-|colspan="4" bgcolor="#e6e9ff"|

 Heretic Rider Go Forth! 

|-|colspan="4" bgcolor="#e6e9ff"|

 RX! Dai-Shocker Invasion 

|-|colspan="4" bgcolor="#e6e9ff"|

 Black × Black RX 

|-|colspan="4" bgcolor="#e6e9ff"|

 Amazon, Friend 

|-|colspan="4" bgcolor="#e6e9ff"|

 The Strong Naked Strongman 

|-|colspan="4" bgcolor="#e6e9ff"|

 Rider War - The Prologue 

|-|colspan="4" bgcolor="#e6e9ff"|

 The Destroyer of Worlds 

|}

References

See also

Decade